David Gilbert Luenberger (born September 16, 1937) is a mathematical scientist known for his research and his textbooks, which center on mathematical optimization. He is a professor in the department of Management Science and Engineering at Stanford University.

Biography 
Luenberger was one of the original founders of the Department of Engineering-Economic Systems in 1967. He served as chairman of the department for eleven years. He worked as a professor at the University for 50 years, retiring as of September 2013.

He has over 70 technical publications on systems and control, in optimization, in microeconomics, and in financial engineering. His Investment Science is widely prescribed and referenced by finance academics and practitioners.

He received his B.S. in Electrical Engineering from the California Institute of Technology in 1959, and he received his Ph.D. in Electrical Engineering from Stanford University in 1963. In his dissertation Luenberger introduced new methods for construction of state observers. The celebrated Luenberger observer is named after him.

Books

References

External links 
List of members of the National Academy of Engineering (Electronics)
Stanford homepage
investmentscience.com
Biography of David Luenberger from the Institute for Operations Research and the Management Sciences

Numerical analysts
American operations researchers
Financial economists
General equilibrium theorists
Microeconomists
Theoretical computer scientists
American computer scientists
Living people
1937 births
Stanford University School of Engineering faculty
Stanford University School of Engineering alumni
Members of the United States National Academy of Engineering
Real options